This is a list of schools in Jersey. It includes non-fee paying schools, States' fee paying schools and private schools.

Primary schools

Non-fee paying primary schools

Bel Royal School
D'Auvergne School
Grands Vaux School
Grouville School
First Tower School
Janvrin School 
La Moye School 
Les Landes School 
Mont Nicolle School
Plat Douet School
Rouge Bouillon School 
St Clement's School
St John's School
St Lawrence School
St Luke's School
St Martin's School
St Mary's School
St Peter's School
St Saviour's School
Samares School
Springfield School 
Trinity School

States' fee paying primary schools
Jersey College Preparatory School 
Victoria College for Boys Preparatory School

Private primary schools
Beaulieu Convent School
De La Salle College
FCJ Primary School
Helvetia House School 
St George's Preparatory School 
St Michael's Preparatory School
St Christopher's Preparatory School

Secondary schools

Non-fee paying secondary schools
Grainville School 
Haute Valleé School
Hautlieu School (selective intake) 
Le Rocquier School 
Les Quennevais School

States' fee paying secondary schools
Jersey College for Girls
Victoria College (for boys)

Private secondary schools
Beaulieu Convent School 
De La Salle College

See also

Education in Jersey
Highlands College, Jersey

References
 
 

 
Jersey
Schools